K260 or K-260 may refer to:

K-260 (Kansas highway), a state highway in Kansas
K260AM, a radio station